Ziziphus rugosa is a species of tree in the family Rhamnaceae. Ziziphus rugosa is also known as zunna berry. And this fruit is also known as Churna fruit. It is a wild fruit.

The tree is native to hills and mountains below  altitude, in China (Hainan, Yunnan), India, Laos, Burma, Sri Lanka, Thailand, and Vietnam. The berry-sized fruit is also has local Indian names like Chunna and Churna.

Its bark and wood are used medicinally for dysentery in Laos.

The population of Western Ghats in India collect the fruits (berries) for self consumption and sale. The berries are popularly known as 'Toran'तोरण in Marathi language.

References

 "Determination of nutritive Value of Ziziphus rugosa"

rugosa
Trees of China
Flora of the Indian subcontinent
Trees of Indo-China
Medicinal plants of Asia